Gergely Szilveszter Karácsony (born 11 June 1975) is a Hungarian politician, political scientist and current Mayor of Budapest. He previously served as member of the National Assembly (MP) from 2010 to 2014 and Mayor of Zugló from 2014 to 2019.

Profession
Karácsony worked for the Medián market and public opinion research company as a research manager. He became Director of Research in 2007. Between 2002 and 2008 he was a political advisor at the Prime Minister's Office. In addition to that, he worked as a teaching assistant at the Corvinus University of Budapest from 2004, an assistant lecturer from 2007 and an assistant professor from 2008.

In May 2021, the Hungarian Office of Education (Oktatási Hivatal) opened an investigation into his appointments as assistant lecturer and assistant professor at Corvinus University. In September, the Office concluded that he did not meet some requirements related to language certificates and doctoral studies required by the university's policy.

Political career
Karácsony became a member of the newly formed Politics Can Be Different (LMP) party in 2009. During the 2010 parliamentary election he served as campaign manager of the party. He became a Member of Parliament from the Budapest regional list (3rd place). In May 2010 he was elected deputy leader of the LMP parliamentary fraction. As a result he left the Medián firm.

He was the party's candidate at the Budapest District II by-election in November 2011. He came third with 6.45 percent after Zsolt Láng (Fidesz) and Katalin Lévai (MSZP). Both MSZP and LMP agreed that the candidate who received fewer votes would withdraw in favour of the stronger one, however Karácsony also participated in the run-off.

In January 2013, the LMP's congress rejected electoral cooperation with other opposition forces, including Together 2014. As a result members of LMP's "Dialogue for Hungary" platform, including Karácsony, announced their decision to leave the opposition party and form a new organisation. Benedek Jávor, leader of the "Dialogue for Hungary" platform, said the eight MPs leaving LMP would keep their parliamentary mandates. The leaving MPs established Dialogue for Hungary (also known as PM, Párbeszéd Magyarországért) as a full-fledged party.

In June 2014, Karácsony was elected co-chair of Dialogue for Hungary (PM) alongside Tímea Szabó, when his predecessor Jávor became a Member of the European Parliament (MEP) in the 2014 European Parliament election. Karácsony won the mayoral election in Zugló during the 2014 local elections as a joint candidate of the Hungarian Socialist Party, Democratic Coalition, and the Together 2014–Dialogue for Hungary alliance. According to the new rules, he also became a member of the General Assembly of Budapest.

In April 2017, Karácsony was re-elected co-leader of the Dialogue for Hungary and was also appointed as his party's candidate for the position of prime minister in the 2018 parliamentary election. The Hungarian Socialist Party also elected Karácsony as their candidate for the position of prime minister in December 2017. The two parties also decided to jointly contest the 2018 national election. Consequently, Together have terminated their cooperation agreement with the Dialogue for Hungary. Under the leadership of Karácsony, the MSZP–PM joint list received 11.91% and came only third after Fidesz and Jobbik.

Mayor of Budapest
In June 2019, in the opposition's first primary election, he was elected as the opposition (MSZP-P-DK-Momentum-LMP-MLP)'s candidate.  While Jobbik did not endorse Karácsony outright, the party opted not to run a candidate against him. This left Karácsony as the sole opposition candidate for the position of Lord Mayor of Budapest in the 2019 local elections, against incumbent Lord Mayor István Tarlós, who was supported by the ruling coalition, Fidesz–KDNP. He then went on to win the election on 13 October 2019 with 50.86% of the votes being cast in his favor, with Tarlós receiving 44.10%.

On Karácsony's initiative, the mayors of the capitals of all four Visegrád Group countries signed the Pact of Free Cities in Budapest in December 2019. The pact promotes "common values of freedom, human dignity, democracy, equality, rule of law, social justice, tolerance and cultural diversity".

He gained international popularity in 2021, when he renamed four streets in Budapest to "Free Hong Kong Street", "Uyghur Martyrs Street", "Dalai Lama Street" and "Bishop Xie Shiguang Street" in protest of the Hungarian government's choice to open a branch of the Fudan University in Budapest, which in 2019 changed its statute, removing the phrase "academic independence and freedom of thought" and including "commitment to follow the leadership of the Communist Party", thus being considered by Karácsony and the thousands of Hungarian citizens who protested against the opening of the Chinese university as a sign of an excessive expansion of Chinese influence in Hungary.

Opposition primary

In May 2021, six opposition parties formed a coalition against Fidesz and Viktor Orbán in the 2022 national elections. Karácsony ran as the prime ministerial candidate of three parties (PM, MSZP and LMP) in the 2021 primary election. During his candidacy, he announced the establishment of a cross-party political movement called 99 Movement on 15 May 2021. Karácsony mentioned the following as its main policy goals:

He also stressed that he wanted a country where no one considers the other a traitor, where there is no need to choose between homeland and progress, nation and Europe, Budapest and the countryside.

Karácsony came in second in the first round of the opposition primary (27.3%) and, beside a few places in the countryside, he could only win in the constituencies of Budapest, where he is serving as mayor (altogether 15 constituencies). Following a week-long negotiation and political tactics, beside the result of opinion polls, Karácsony dropped out and endorsed Péter Márki-Zay, who came in third place and eventually won the second round against Klára Dobrev and became the nominee of the opposition for the position of prime minister in the 2022 parliamentary election. Political analysts described his withdrawal as a political failure, which, for the first time, has stalled his upward career since 2010. Before the opposition primary, Karácsony was considered the towering favorite of the primary, who in recent years has built an image of the face of the opposition. The ruling party Fidesz also targeted him with a negative campaign (the slogan "Stop Gyurcsány, stop Karácsony!") during the primary. According to experts, Karácsony launched his campaign late, did not campaign in the summer (unlike his opponents), had no strong message and was prematurely focused on the 2022 election and defeating Viktor Orbán.

References

External links
 
 Karácsony Gergely webpage 

1975 births
Living people
LMP – Hungary's Green Party politicians
Dialogue for Hungary politicians
Members of the National Assembly of Hungary (2010–2014)
Members of the National Assembly of Hungary (2018–2022)
Members of the National Assembly of Hungary (2022–2026)
Academic staff of the Corvinus University of Budapest
Mayors of Budapest